Jorge Garbey can refer to:

 Jorge Garbey (fencer) (born 1953), Cuban fencer
 Jorge Garbey (volleyball) (born 1954), volleyball player